Smedley can refer to:

People

Given name
Smedley Butler (1881–1940), U.S. Marine Corps major general, double recipient of the Medal of Honor
Smedley Crooke (1861–1951), British politician
Smedley Darlington (1827–1899), American politician

Surname
Agnes Smedley (1892–1950), American journalist and writer
Audrey Smedley (1930–2020), American social anthropologist
Bert Smedley (1905–unknown), Australian rules footballer 
Brian Smedley (1934–2007), British judge
Cameron Smedley (born 1990), Canadian canoeist
Edward Smedley (1788–1836), English clergyman and writer
Elizabeth Anna Hart (1822–1890), née Smedley, British poet and novelist
Eric Smedley (born 1973), former professional American football player
Francis Edward Smedley (1818–1864), English novelist and writer
Harold Smedley (1920–2004), British diplomat 
Hugh Smedley, New Zealand rower
John Smedley (disambiguation)
Jonathan Smedley (1671–1729), Anglo-Irish churchman and polemicist
Karen Smedley (born 1972), American professional wrestling valet
Kayla Bashore Smedley (born 1983), American field hockey player
Larry E. Smedley (1949–1967), United States Marine corporal, posthumous recipient of the Medal of Honor in Vietnam
Menella Bute Smedley (1820–1877), English novelist and poet
Michael Smedley (born 1941), English cricketer
Oliver Smedley (1911–1989), English businessman and activist
Peter Smedley (born 1943), Australian businessman
Ralph C. Smedley (1878–1965), American teacher and YMCA director who founded Toastmasters International
Rob Smedley (born 1973), English engineer for F1 driver Felipe Massa
Robert Smedley (born 1963), American professional wrestler
Samuel Smedley (1753–1812), American Revolutionary War ship captain
William Thomas Smedley (1858–1920), American artist

Pseudonym
 Smedley, reported to have been closely involved with the founding of the darknet market Silk Road

Places
Smedley, Manchester, an area in north Manchester, England, United Kingdom
Smedley, Indiana, an unincorporated community, United States
Smedley, Virginia, an unincorporated community, United States

Other uses
Smedley Elementary School, Philadelphia, Pennsylvania, United States, a charter school on the National Register of Historic Places
Smedley, a character in the Chilly Willy animated cartoon